Roxas, officially the Municipality of President Manuel A. Roxas, is a 5th class municipality in the province of Zamboanga del Norte, Philippines. According to the 2020 census, it has a population of 39,198 people.

History
The municipality of Pres. Manuel A. Roxas was first created from the municipality of Katipunan in 1965 by President Diosdado Macapagal through Presidential Proclamation No. 177. However, its creation was questioned by Vice President Emmanuel Pelaez, and was later reverted by the Supreme Court of the Philippines as one of Katipunan's barangays.

On June 17, 1967, through the effort of former Congressman Alberto Q. Ubay, Republic Act No. 5077 was lapsed into law without President Ferdinand Marcos's signature, carving out from Katipunan once more.

Geography

Barangays
Roxas is politically subdivided into 31 barangays:

Climate

Demographics

Economy

References

External links
 Roxas, Zamboanga del Norte Profile at PhilAtlas.com
 [ Philippine Standard Geographic Code]
Philippine Census Information

Municipalities of Zamboanga del Norte